An autism assistance dog or autism service dog is an assistance dog trained to assist a person with autism to help them gain independence and the ability to perform activities of daily living similar to people without autism.

History 
The first autism assistance dog was trained by Chris Fowler. Chris Fowler founded the first organization worldwide called National Service Dogs in 1996. He placed a dog named Shade with a child with autism in 1997. Autism is a lifelong disability with characteristics that vary from person to person.  Training for autism assistance dogs is similar to guide dog training. Autism assistance dogs usually cost between $12,000 and $30,000. There is a long waiting list for the dogs.

Anecdotal evidence of the efficacy of autism assistance dogs is greater than the amount of research on the practice. Without objective standards, it can be difficult for parents, caregivers, and educators to make a case for the need for autism assistance dogs.

Function
Autism assistance dogs are trained to perform specific tasks to help their owners live independently and navigate the world.  They can help their owner get ready in the morning, alert people of emergencies, pick up items, aid their owner when they have sensory overload, and many more tasks depending on the individual.

Children 
The primary focus of an autism assistance dog for a child is to protect the safety of the children they work with. For example, autism assistance dogs are sometimes trained to prevent children with autism from leaving the house unsupervised. When autism assistance dogs are paired with children, the dog takes commands from the parents, not the child. Autism assistance dogs also alert parents of dangerous situations regarding the children they work with. Autism assistance dogs can help open the door for children and keep them from becoming overstimulated.

Some children with autism have been reported to have an increased sense of independence because of their interactions with the autism assistance dog.

Sometimes a child harness—attached to an autism assistance dog—is worn by an children with autism child.  There recently has been controversy over this, due to the sudden force put on the dog.

Adults 
As with hearing dogs for the deaf, the dogs may be trained to alert their handler to important noises or other things requiring human intervention, such as smoke or a smoke alarm, a crying baby, a telephone ringing, or a knock at the door. For a person with autism, it may not be immediately obvious which of the many external stimuli is the urgent one requiring their immediate attention. A person with autism may have to sort through both major and minor stimuli—the sound of crickets, the smell of the fabric softener on their clothes, a car driving past outside—to determine which of these, if any, needs their attention. They may understand that a smoke alarm is urgent and requires them to exit the building, but it might take more time to realize the alarm is sounding in the first place.

Autism assistance dogs may use a command to "ground" their owners by sitting on their feet, applying pressure when the owner is anxious.

See also 
Guide dog
Hearing dog
Medical response dog
Mobility assistance dog
Psychiatric service dog
Seizure dog
Service animal
Child harness

References

Citations

Sources 
 
 

Assistance dogs
Treatment of autism